Datuk Seri Panglima Wilfred Bumburing (born 2 December 1951) is a Malaysian politician. He is a member of the Sabah State Legislative Assembly and a former Member of the Parliament of Malaysia for the seat of Tuaran, Sabah (2008–2013).

Bumburing was first elected to the State Assembly in 1986, as a member of the United Sabah Party (PBS). In 1994, he joined Bernard Dompok in defecting from PBS to join the Barisan Nasional coalition, setting up the party that subsequently became the United Pasokmomogun Kadazandusun Murut Organisation (UPKO). He was a Deputy Chief Minister in the Barisan Nasional government.

He was elected to federal Parliament in the 2008 election for the seat of Tuaran. His election came after UPKO's incumbent member Wilfred Madius Tangau stood down citing the wishes of the party's leadership. In 2011, he left UPKO to sit in Parliament as a member of People's Justice Party (PKR) of the opposition Pakatan Rakyat coalition. He recontested the 2013 election as a PKR candidate, but lost his seat to Tangau, who had returned to the UPKO deputy presidency. C did, however, win the seat of Tamparuli in the Sabah State Legislative Assembly. In 2016 Wilfred Bumburing left PKR for the newly formed Love Sabah Party (PCS) and was elected as its new president.

Election results

Honours
  :
  Companion of the Order of Loyalty to the Crown of Malaysia (JSM) (1995)
  Commander of the Order of Meritorious Service (PJN) – Datuk (2007)
  :
  Commander of the Order of Kinabalu (PGDK) – Datuk (1990)
  Grand Commander of the Order of Kinabalu (SPDK) – Datuk Seri Panglima (2004)

References 

Living people
1951 births
People from Sabah
Members of the Dewan Rakyat
Kadazan-Dusun people
United Sabah Party politicians
United Progressive Kinabalu Organisation politicians
People's Justice Party (Malaysia) politicians
Independent politicians in Malaysia
Members of the Sabah State Legislative Assembly
Companions of the Order of Loyalty to the Crown of Malaysia
Commanders of the Order of Meritorious Service
Commanders of the Order of Kinabalu
Grand Commanders of the Order of Kinabalu